Hydrillodes truncata is a litter moth of the family Erebidae. It was first described by Frederic Moore in 1882 and is found in India.

References

Herminiinae
Moths of Asia
Moths described in 1882